The 1860 United States presidential election in Pennsylvania took place on November 6, 1860, as part of the 1860 United States presidential election. Voters chose 27 representatives, or electors to the Electoral College, who voted for president and vice president.

The Democratic Party chose its slate of electors before the National Convention in Charleston, South Carolina. Since this was decided before the party split, both Douglas supporters and Breckinridge supporters claimed the right for their man to be considered the party candidate and the support of the electoral slate. Eventually, the state party worked out an agreement: if either candidate could win the national election with Pennsylvania's electoral vote, then all her electoral votes would go to that candidate. Of the 27 electoral candidates, 15 were Breckinridge supporters; the remaining 12 were for Douglas. This was often referred to as the Reading electoral slate, because it was in that city that the state party chose it.

Not all of the Douglas supporters agreed to the Reading slate deal and established a separate Douglas-only ticket. This slate comprised the 12 Douglas electoral candidates on the Reading ticket, and 15 additional Douglas supporters. This ticket was usually referred to as the Straight Douglas ticket. Thus 12 electoral candidates appeared on 2 tickets, Reading and Straight Douglas.

Pennsylvania voted for the Republican candidate, Abraham Lincoln, over the fusion ticket. Lincoln won Pennsylvania by a margin of 18.72%. Lincoln’s victory was the first of eighteen out of nineteen Republican victories in the state, as Pennsylvania would not vote Democratic again until Franklin D. Roosevelt in 1936, and would not vote for a different candidate again until Theodore Roosevelt’s third-party bid in 1912.

Pennsylvania in the election was one of the four states that had a fusion ticket for the Democratic Party. The other three states were New Jersey, New York and Rhode Island.

The 1860 presidential election in Pennsylvania began a trend in which the state would vote the same as nearby Michigan, as the two states would vote in lockstep with each other on all but three occasions since Lincoln’s victory - 1932, 1940, and 1976.

Results

See also
 List of United States presidential elections in Pennsylvania

References

Pennsylvania
1860
1860 Pennsylvania elections